Hossein Khan Motamed, M.D. (also known as Doctor Hossein Khan Motamed) (born in 1893–death in 1955) was an Iranian surgeon and founder of Motamed Hospital in Tehran, Iran. Decorated with first (1925) and second place (1917) for the Scientific Medal of Iran.

Biography

Early life 
Hossein Motamed was born February 26, 1893, in Tehran Iran.  He was the son of Abdol Karim Motamed (Motamed ol Hokama) and Kokab GolSorkhi.  He graduated from the Medical School of Tehran, Tehran University in 1915 later to be known as Tehran University of Medical Sciences, and also studied and completed his Residency (medicine) abroad in Paris Université de Paris and Paris hospitals in France.  He married Azizol Molouk Maham in 1922.  His children; Fereydoun Motamed, Fahimeh Motamed Thomas, M.D., and Manuchehr Motamed, M.D.

Work 
Hossein Khan Motamed began his career as an assistant surgeon in City Hospital of Tehran, 1915–1917.  In a short time he became the chief of surgery section 1919-1920. He then became the chief of surgical section in Sina Hospital (also known as Sepah)1920–1922 and later chief of surgical section of Military Pahlavi Hospital with a rank of Colonel 1922–1936.

Dr. Motamed founded his own hospital, Motamed Hospital.  Motamed Hospital was the only School of Medicine (Madreseh-ye Tebb) at that time after division of medicine had separated from Dar ul-Funun in earlier years. Motamed became the director and chief surgeon of his hospital in the years 1936–1940.  Dr. Motamed was the first Iranian professor of surgery, he had his surgical training at Sina Hospital under the supervision of Dr. Ilberg from Germany. Dr. Ilberg was the chief of the Sina Hospital's surgical ward before World War I. After Dr. Ilberg departed Iran at the onset of World War I, Dr. Motamed took over his position. Many of the pioneer surgeons in the country including Dr. Sadegh Ghazi and Dr. Anwar Shakki received their surgical training from Dr. Motamed. Dr. Motamed is the first Iranian surgeon who conducted a gastrectomy and lumbar sympatectomy in Iran.  He held surgical procedures classes in Motamed hospital, prior to which no educational hospital existed in Iran. He taught subjects such as pathology, histology, and embryology.  His hospital had five free beds for the poor.  He also became the director of surgical clinic of Razi City Hospital in Tehran 1940–1944.

Motamed was a professor and Adviser of Faculty at Medical University of Tehran of surgical theory and author of text in operative surgery 1939, and study in Hernia 1943. He was also Reza Shah Pahlavi, the Shah of Iran's personal physician.

Dr. Motamed immigrated to United States in 1944 toward the end of World War II and became a United States citizen in 1954.  He was a resident of Garden City, New York where he also held a practice.

Awards and honoraria
Scientific Medal of Iran, First (1925) and Second place (1917)

Publications
Operative Surgery 1939
Study in Hernia 1943

Offices held
Assistance surgeon, City Hospital of Tehran, Iran 1915-17.
Chief of surgery section, City Hospital of Tehran, Iran 1919-1920.
Chief of surgical section, Sina/Sepah Hospital, Tehran, Iran 1920-1922.
Chief of surgical section, Military Pahlavi Hospital, Tehran, Iran 1922-1936.
Founder of Motamed Hospital, Tehran, Iran 1936.
Director and chief surgeon, Motamed Hospital, Tehran, Iran 1936-1940.
Director of surgical clinic, Razi city hospital, Tehran, Iran 1940-1944.
Medical Practice, Garden City, New York, 1944-1955.

Education
1915 Medical Doctorate (M.D.), degree from Medical School of Tehran (also known as Dar ul-Funun).
1917 Medical Residency, Université de Paris

References

External links
A Historical Review of the Development of Pathology in Iran
Urology as a Specialty in the History of Contemporary Medicine in Iran
History of Contemporary Medicine in Iran, Development of Thoracic Surgery in Iran

1893 births
1955 deaths
Iranian emigrants to the United States
People from Garden City, New York
Iranian medical researchers
University of Tehran alumni
University of Paris alumni